Scott Miller may refer to:

Musicians
Scott Miller (pop musician) (1960–2013), rock guitarist, songwriter, author, founder of bands Game Theory and The Loud Family
Scott Miller (country musician) (born 1968), Southern rock singer with the Commonwealth, former member of the V-Roys

Sports
Scott Miller (1990s wide receiver) (born 1968), American former football wide receiver
Scotty Miller (born 1997), American football wide receiver
Scott Miller (soccer, born 1972), Australian soccer coach and former player
Scott Miller (soccer, born 1981), Australian soccer coach and former player
Scott Miller (swimmer) (born 1975), Australian Olympic silver medalist in swimming

Others
Scott Miller (activist), American LGBT rights activist and philanthrophist
Scott Miller (artist) (1955–2008), American painter from Cleveland, Ohio
Scott Miller (author) (born 1960), American journalist, author of The President and the Assassin 
Scott Miller (entrepreneur) (born 1961), founder of Apogee Software, programmer and developer of games such as Duke Nukem
Scott Allen Miller (born 1970), American disc jockey, producer, and talk radio host
Scott Douglas Miller (born 1959), American university president
Scott D. Miller, chief executive officer of SSA & Company
Scott L. Miller, American composer

See also
Austin Scott Miller, United States Army general, appointed in 2018 as commander of NATO forces in Afghanistan